NBCUniversal Media, LLC is a media conglomerate that is a division of Comcast and is headquartered at the Comcast Building in Midtown Manhattan, New York City. It has film, television, cable networks, and publishing operations.

This is a listing of all of its brands, as shown at the company's website.

NBCUniversal Television and Streaming
 NBCUniversal Syndication Studios
 International Media Distribution
 EMKA, Ltd.
NBC Entertainment

 National Broadcasting Company
 NBC Studios

Entertainment Networks
 E! Studios
 Wilshire Studios, reality studio
 Syfy
 USA Network
 Bravo
 E!
 Oxygen
 Universal Kids

NBCUniversal Telemundo Enterprises
Telemundo
Noticias Telemundo
Universo
 Telemundo of Puerto Rico Studios
 Telemundo Studios
 Telemundo Global Studios
 Telemundo Streaming Studios
 Underground Producciones
 Telemundo Internacional
 Telemundo Films

NBCUniversal Owned Television Stations
 Affiliate Relations
 NBC Owned Television Stations
 Cozi TV
 K15CU-D 15 – Salinas
 KNBC 4 – Los Angeles
 KNSD 39 (cable 7) – San Diego²
 KNTV 11 – San Jose/San Francisco
 KXAS 5 – Dallas/Fort Worth²
 LXTV
 NECN
 WBTS-CD – Boston
 WCAU 10 – Philadelphia
 WMAQ 5 – Chicago
 WNBC 4 – New York
 WRC 4 – Washington
 WTVJ 6 – Miami
 WVIT 30 – Hartford
 Telemundo Station Group
 KBLR – Las Vegas
 KCSO – Sacramento
 KDEN-TV – Longmont, Colorado
 KHRR – Tucson
 KNSO – Fresno
 KSTS – San Jose/San Francisco
 KTAZ – Phoenix
 KTDO – El Paso
 KTMD – Houston
 KTMW – Salt Lake City
 KUAN – San Diego
 KVDA – San Antonio
 KVEA – Los Angeles
 KXTX – Dallas/Fort Worth
 TeleXitos
 WKAQ – Puerto Rico 
 WNEU – Boston/Merrimack
 WNJU – New York
 WRDM – Hartford
 WRIW – Providence
 WRMD – Tampa
 WSCV – Miami
 WSNS – Chicago
 WTMO – Orlando
 WZDC – Washington
 Skycastle Entertainment

NBC Sports Group
 Golf Channel
 MLB Network (5.44%) joint venture with Major League Baseball and other providers
 NBC Olympics, LLC
 NBC Olympic broadcasts
 NBC Sports
 NHL Network (15.6%) joint venture with National Hockey League
 SportsEngine
 Telemundo Deportes
 NBC Sports Regional Networks
 NBC Sports Bay Area (45%)
 NBC Sports California
 NBC Sports Chicago (20%)
 NBC Sports Washington
 NBC Sports Washington+
 NBC Sports Boston
 NBC Sports Philadelphia (75%)
 NBC Sports Philadelphia+
 SNY (8%) joint venture with Sterling Equities and Charter Communications
 NBC Sports Films
 NBC Sports Digital
 Playmaker Media
 Allstar Stats LLC.
 NBC Sports Edge
 Revolution Golf
 GolfPass
 NBC Sports Gold
 GolfNow
 NBC Sports Digital Network
 NBC Sports Ventures LLC.
 Alli Sports
 NBC Sports Radio
 World Long Drivers Association
 World Long Drive Championships
 American Century Championship
 Father/Son Challenge (With IMG)
 National Dog Show
 Beverly Hills Dog Show
 All-American Bowl

Direct-to-Consumer
 Fandango Media (70%, joint venture with Warner Bros.)
 Rotten Tomatoes Movieclips
 Rotten Tomatoes
 Fandango Latam
 Movies.com
 MovieTickets.com
 Vudu
 Stakes:
 Snap Inc.
 BuzzFeed
 HuffPost
 Complex Networks
 First We Feast
 Vox Media
 Hulu (33%, stake can be sold to The Walt Disney Company from January 2024)
 Hulu Documentary Films
 Hayu
 Integrated Media Group
 Peacock
 Peacock Kids
 PictureBox Films

NBCUniversal International Networks

 Universal TV 
 Latin America (operated and distributed by Ole Distribution)
 Brazil (joint venture with Canais Globo (50%), distributed by Canais Globo)
 Turkey
 Syfy
 Latin America (operated and distributed by Ole Distribution)
 Brazil (joint venture with Canais Globo (50%), distributed by Canais Globo)
 Russia
 Sci Fi (Poland)
 Sci Fi (Serbia)
 Sci Fi (Slovenia)
 13th Street
 13ème Rue Universal
 13th Street (Germany) 
 Calle 13 (Spain)
 Movies 24
 Eastern Europe
 Russia and Moldova
 Movies 24+
 E! (Europe)
 E! (Australia)
 Studio Universal
 Latin America (operated and distributed by Ole Distribution)
 Brazil (joint venture with Canais Globo (50%), distributed by Canais Globo)
 DreamWorks Channel
 Telemundo Africa

NBCUniversal News Group

 CNBC
 CNBC World
 CNBC Africa
 CNBC Asia
 CNBC Europe
 CNBC Arabiya
 CNBC TV18 (joint venture with Network 18)
 CNBC Awaaz (joint venture with Network 18)
 Nikkei CNBC (joint venture with The Nikkei and TV Tokyo)
 SBS CNBC (joint venture with SBS Media Holdings)
 Class CNBC (joint venture with Class Editori and Mediaset)
 NBC News
 MSNBC
 NBCNews.com
 NBCUniversal Archives
 NBC News Studios
 MSNBC Films
 NBC News Channel.
 NBC News Digital Group
 NBC News International
NBC News Now

Universal Studio Group

 Universal Television
 Universal Television Alternative Studio
 SNL Studios (With Lorne Michaels)
 Paramount Pictures (1929-1949 library)
 Universal Content Productions
 UCP Audio (2020)
 Universal International Studios
 Heyday Television (joint venture with Heyday Films) (UK)
 Chocolate Media (UK)
 Lark Productions (Canada)
 Lucky Giant (UK)
 Monkey Kingdom (UK)
 Matchbox Pictures (Australia)
NBCUniversal Formats
NBCUniversal Global Distribution

Universal Destinations & Experiences 

 Universal Orlando Resort
 Universal Studios Hollywood
 Universal Studios Japan
 Universal CityWalk
 Universal Studios Singapore
 Universal Creative
 Universal Beijing Resort

NBCUniversal Film and Entertainment

 Universal Pictures
 Illumination
 Illumination Labs
 Illumination Studios Paris
 DreamWorks Animation
DreamWorks Animation Television
 DreamWorks Classics
Harvey Entertainment (in name-only unit) 
 DreamWorks Theatricals
 DreamWorks New Media
 DreamWorks Press
 Focus Features                                                                                                                   
 Amblin Partners (minority stake; joint venture with The Amblin Group, Reliance Entertainment, Entertainment One, and Alibaba Pictures)
 DreamWorks Pictures
 Amblin Entertainment
 Amblin Television
 Blumhouse Productions (minority stake with Jason Blum)
 Working Title Films
 WT2 Productions
 Working Title Television
 Carnival Films
 Universal Animation Studios
 Universal Pictures International
 Universal International Distribution
 Universal Home Entertainment
 Universal Home Entertainment Productions
 Universal 1440 Entertainment
 Universal Sony Pictures Home Entertainment Australia (joint venture with Sony Pictures Home Entertainment)
 Universal Playback
 Studio Distribution Services (joint venture with Warner Bros. Home Entertainment)
 United International Pictures (50%, joint venture with Paramount Global's Paramount Pictures)
 Rede Telecine (10%, joint venture with Canais Globo, Disney, Paramount Pictures and Metro-Goldwyn-Mayer)
 Universal Pictures International Entertainment
 NBCUniversal Entertainment Japan
 Back Lot Music
 OTL Releasing
 Universal Brand Development

Former assets

Divested
 A&E Networks (15.8%, with The Walt Disney Company and Hearst)
 A&E
 Crime & Investigation Network
 FYI (formerly The Biography Channel)
 The History Network
 History en Español
 Military History Channel
 Lifetime
 LMN (formerly Lifetime Movie Network)
 LRW (formerly Lifetime Real Women)
 AwesomenessTV: sold in 2018 to Paramount Global
 CIC Video: Paramount Home Entertainment acquired Universal's stake in the company and absorbed it in 1999
 Comcast SportsNet Houston
 Court TV
 Craftsy (formerly Bluprint): now owned by TN Marketing
 Das Vierte
 Euronews (25%) - NBCUniversal sold its stake to other stakeholders
 Loews Cineplex Entertainment (50% with Sony) - 1998 merger of Cineplex Odeon Corporation: Theatres owned by AMC Theatres in the U.S. and Cineplex Entertainment in Canada
 Pearl Studio (formerly known as Oriental DreamWorks) (45%, with China Media Capital, Shanghai Media Group and Shanghai Alliance Investment): NBCUniversal sold its stake in the studio in 2018 to CMC for restructuring and possibly problems with Chinese antitrust investigation.
 Rogue Pictures: sold to Relativity Media in 2009
 ShopNBC
 Sundance Channel
 TV One (50% joint venture with Radio One)
 Universal Music Group: retained by Vivendi following the merger of NBC and Universal in 2004, then spun-off in an IPO in 2021
 Vivendi Universal Games: retained by Vivendi following the merger of NBC and Universal, then merged with Activision in 2008 to form Activision Blizzard
 The Weather Company – with private equity firms Bain Capital and The Blackstone Group: Originally a parent company of The Weather Channel. In January 2016, it was acquired by IBM.
 The Weather Channel – with private equity firms Bain Capital and The Blackstone Group: sold to Entertainment Studios.

Dormant or shuttered
 American Sports Classics
 Anime Selects
 AZN Television: TV channel focused on Asian and Asian-American culture; formerly known as International Channel from its foundation in 1996 to 2005; shut down in 2008
 Bullwinkle Studios (50%, joint venture with Jay Ward Productions): Dissolved February 2022 following transfer of Jay Ward Productions library to WildBrain; NBCUniversal retains rights to all Bullwinkle Studios-era co-productions. 
 Chiller
 Chiller Films
 Cloo
 The Comcast Network
 Comcast/Charter Sports Southeast (with Charter Communications)
 Comcast Sports Southwest
 DreamWorks Animation Home Entertainment - folded into Universal Pictures Home Entertainment
 Esquire Network
 Fearnet (with Lions Gate Entertainment and Sony Pictures Entertainment)
 G4 (88% with Dish Network): first incarnation was closed down on December 31, 2014; meanwhile, second incarnation of the channel which operated by sister company Comcast Spectacor was closed down on November 18, 2022.
 MountainWest Sports Network (controlling stake)
 NBC Sports Northwest
 NBC Weather Plus
 NBCSN
 NewSport
 Olympic Channel
 Peacock Productions
 TOMORROW
 Sky Vision
 SportsChannel
 Station Venture Holdings (79.62% with LIN Media)
 Style Network (Australia)
 Television Without Pity: ceased its operations on May 31, 2014; relaunched under Tribune Media in 2016 later closed in 2017
 Trio
 Universal Sports Network (8% with InterMedia Partners)
 USA Cable Entertainment: folded into NBC Universal Television Studio in 2004
 MCA TV
 MTE
 Multimedia Entertainment: acquired by Universal Television in 1996
 Multimedia Motion Pictures
 NBC Enterprises
 NBC International Ltd.
 PolyGram Television
 ITC Entertainment: folded into PolyGram Television in 1997, library assets sold to Carlton Communications in 1999
 DailyCandy
 FandangoNow (formerly M-GO)
 iVillage
 Seeso
 Shift
 Chapman Entertainment: acquired by DreamWorks Animation in 2013
 Entertainment Rights
 Carrington Productions International
 Link Entertainment
 Tell-Tale Productions
 FilmDistrict: folded into Focus Features in 2014
 High Top Releasing
 Focus World
 Golden Books Family Entertainment: acquired by Classic Media in 2001
 CST Entertainment
 Shari Lewis Enterprises
 Total Television
 Good Machine: sold to Universal Pictures and merged into Focus Features
 Gramercy Pictures
 October Films: merged into USA Films, which was later merged into Focus Features
 Optical Programming Associates: joint venture between Magnavox, MCA Videodisc, and Pioneer Video
 PolyGram Filmed Entertainment
 Associated Film Distribution
 PolyGram Pictures
 Propaganda Films
 Savoy Pictures: library acquired by Focus Features in 2006
 Universal Eight
 Universal TV (British and Irish TV channel)
 Universal Channel (Asia)
 UPA: acquired by Classic Media in 2000
 USA Home Entertainment
 Walter Lantz Productions: sold to MCA Inc. in 1984
 13th Street Australia
 Diva TV
 Diva (Asia)
 E! (Asia)
 KidsCo (51% with Corus Entertainment)
 Hallmark Channel International
 Qubo (with Ion Media, Scholastic Entertainment, Classic Media and Corus Entertainment): children's programming block that launched in 2006, which later launched as a linear channel in 2007. In 2012, NBC and Telemundo discontinued their Qubo blocks after Comcast acquired NBCUniversal. Following the acquisition of Ion Media by the E. W. Scripps Company on January 7, 2021, Qubo ceased operations on February 28, 2021.
 Premium Movie Partnership (with Sony Pictures Entertainment, CBS Corporation, News Corporation and Liberty Global)
 Showtime Australian movie channels
 Showcase
 Showtime Greats
 Steel
 TV1 General Entertainment Partnership (with Sony Pictures Television and CBS Studios International)
 TV1
 SF
 Wet 'n Wild Orlando: closed on December 31, 2016 and replaced by Volcano Bay.

See also
 Lists of corporate assets

References

External links
 NBCUniversal official website

NBCUniversal
Cable television companies of the United States